Reinhold Baer (22 July 1902 – 22 October 1979) was a German mathematician, known for his work in algebra. He introduced injective modules in 1940.  He is the eponym of Baer rings and Baer groups.

Biography
Baer studied mechanical engineering for a year at Leibniz University Hannover. He then went to study philosophy at Freiburg in 1921. While he was at Göttingen in 1922 he was influenced by Emmy Noether and Hellmuth Kneser. In 1924 he won a scholarship for specially gifted students. Baer wrote up his doctoral dissertation and it was published in Crelle's Journal in 1927.

Baer accepted a post at Halle in 1928. There, he published Ernst Steinitz's "Algebraische Theorie der Körper" with Helmut Hasse, first published in Crelle's Journal in 1910.

While Baer was with his wife in Austria, Adolf Hitler and the Nazis came into power. Both of Baer's parents were Jewish, and he was for this reason informed that his services at Halle were no longer required. Louis Mordell invited him to go to Manchester and Baer accepted.

Baer stayed at Princeton University and was a visiting scholar at the nearby Institute for Advanced Study from 1935 to 1937.  For a short while he lived in North Carolina. From 1938 to 1956 he worked at the University of Illinois at Urbana-Champaign. He returned to Germany in 1956.

According to biographer K. W. Gruenberg,
The rapid development of lattice theory in the mid-thirties suggested that projective geometry should be viewed as a special kind of lattice, the lattice of all subspaces of a vector space... [Linear Algebra and Projective Geometry (1952)] is an account of the representation of vector spaces over division rings, of projectivities by semi-linear transformations and of dualities by semi-bilinear forms.

He died of heart failure on October 22 in 1979.

In 2016 the Reinhold Baer Prize for the best Ph.D. thesis in group theory was set up in his honour.

Bibliography

 1934: "Erweiterung von Gruppen und ihren Isomorphismen", Mathematische Zeitschrift 38(1): 375–416 (German)  
 1940: "Nilpotent groups and their generalizations", Transactions of the American Mathematical Society 47: 393–434 
 1944: "The higher commutator subgroups of a group", Bulletin of the American Mathematical Society 50: 143–160  
 1945: "Representations of groups as quotient groups. II. Minimal central chains of a group", Transactions of the American Mathematical Society 58: 348–389 
 1945: "Representations of groups as quotient groups. III. Invariants of classes of related representations", Transactions of the American Mathematical Society 58: 390–419 

See also
Capable group
Dedekind group
Retract (group theory)
Radical of a ring
Semiprime ring
Nielsen-Schreier theorem

References

 O. H. Kegel (1979) "Reinhold Baer (1902 — 1979)", Mathematical Intelligencer 2:181,2.

External links
 
 K.W. Gruenberg & Derek Robinson (2003) The Mathematical Legacy of Reinhold Baer, Illinois Journal of Mathematics'' 47(1-2) from Project Euclid.
 Author profile in the database zbMATH 
 Baer Family's Schedule of 1940 US Census.
 Reproduction of a talk given by Baer on his last lecture in 1967, before his retirement from the University of Frankfurt  - here is a translation.

1902 births
1979 deaths
Scientists from Berlin
Jewish emigrants from Nazi Germany to the United States
20th-century German mathematicians
Algebraists
University of Freiburg alumni
University of Göttingen alumni
Academic staff of the Martin Luther University of Halle-Wittenberg
Princeton University faculty
Institute for Advanced Study visiting scholars
University of Illinois Urbana-Champaign faculty
Academic staff of Goethe University Frankfurt